is a Japanese professional racing cyclist, who currently rides for UCI Continental team .

Career
Born in Sendai, Masuda attended Nihon University. While there, he started riding for Team Miyata, as well as provided the power for the university's human-powered aircraft.

In October 2012, it was announced that he had been signed by the  team, for the 2013 season. He remained with the team for one year, before rejoining  for the 2014 season.

In 2017 he was diagnosed with Graves' disease and couldn't race for most of the season.

Major results

2007
 6th Tour de Okinawa
 8th Overall Tour de Hokkaido
2011
 9th Overall Tour de Kumano
2012
 2nd Road race, National Road Championships
 4th Overall Tour de Kumano
 4th Overall Tour de Hokkaido
2013
 3rd Road race, National Road Championships
2014
 1st Tour de Okinawa
 10th Overall Tour of Japan
 10th Overall Tour de Kumano
2015
 National Road Championships
2nd Time trial
3rd Road race
2016
 1st  Overall Tour de Hokkaido
1st  Mountains classification
1st Stage 2
 1st Tour de Okinawa
 National Road Championships
3rd Time trial
5th Road race
 4th Time trial, Asian Road Championships
 10th Overall Tour of Japan
2017
 2nd  Team time trial, Asian Road Championships
2018
 3rd Overall Tour de Tochigi
 8th Oita Urban Classic
 8th Tour de Okinawa
2019
 1st  Time trial, National Road Championships
 1st Tour de Okinawa
 5th Overall Tour de Langkawi
 7th Road race, Asian Road Championships
 8th Overall Tour de Taiwan
1st Asian rider classification
 10th Overall Tour of Japan
2021
 National Road Championships
1st  Time trial
2nd Road race
 1st Overall Tour of Japan
1st Mountains classification
1st Stage 1
2022
 Asian Road Cycling Championships
2nd  Road race
2nd  Time trial
 4th Overall Tour of Japan
 4th Overall Tour de Kumano
 10th Oita Urban Classic

References

External links

1983 births
Living people
Japanese male cyclists
Sportspeople from Sendai
Nihon University alumni
Olympic cyclists of Japan
Cyclists at the 2020 Summer Olympics
20th-century Japanese people
21st-century Japanese people